Bill Crews may refer to:
 Bill Crews (politician)
 Bill Crews (minister)